There are 175 state parks and 9 state trails in the U.S. state of Florida which encompass more than , providing recreational opportunities for both residents and tourists.

Almost half of the state parks have an associated local 501(c)(3) non-profit corporation, often styled, "Friends of {park name} State Park, Inc.". 
In 2015, some 29,356 volunteers donated nearly 1.3 million hours to enhance the parks for approximately 31 million visitors. There is a mostly nominal admission to nearly all Florida's state parks, although separate fees are charged for the use of cabins, marinas, campsites, etc.

The Florida Park Service is the division of the Florida Department of Environmental Protection responsible for the operation of Florida State Parks, and won the Gold Medal honoring the best state park system in the country in 1999 and 2005 from the National Recreation and Park Association. They were also finalists in the 1997 and 2011 competitions. The Park Service was awarded the gold medal again in October 2013, making it the only three-time winner. In 2019, they received the gold medal award again, resulting in them being the first four-time winner. The parks are open year-round and offer diverse activities beyond fishing, hiking and camping. Many parks offer facilities for birding or horseback riding; there are several battle reenactments; and freshwater springs and beaches are Florida's gems. According to the Florida Park Service website, their goal "is to help create a sense of place by showing park visitors the best of Florida's diverse natural and cultural sites. Florida's state parks are managed and preserved for enjoyment by this and future generations through providing appropriate resource-based recreational opportunities, interpretation and education that help visitors connect to the Real Florida."

Several state parks were formerly private tourist attractions purchased by the state of Florida to preserve their natural environment. These parks include the Silver Springs State Park, Homosassa Springs Wildlife State Park, Rainbow Springs State Park, and Weeki Wachee Springs.
There are state parks in 58 of Florida's 67 counties. Nine of the 175 parks do not have "State Park" in their name. Four are "conservation areas" (reserve, preserve, or wildlife refuge); three are "Historical/Archaeological sites"; one is a fishing pier and one is a recreation area. Seven parks are mostly undeveloped with few or no facilities; 10 parks are accessible only by private boat or ferry; and 13 parks contain National Natural Landmarks. Additionally, there are eleven national parks and service sites in Florida locations under control of the National Park Service.

Florida State Parks are supported by tax dollars (document stamps), user fees, and to a much smaller extent charitable contributions. Some state parks have an associated local 501(c)(3) corporation. Most parks charge an entrance fee. Residents can purchase an annual entrance pass that is valid at any of the parks. Camping is available in campsites in some of the parks. All reservations for park facilities are handled through the private corporation ReserveAmerica. Florida State Parks provides an updated online guide to all parks.

Florida state parks and reserves

Note: The table of contents only applies when the list is sorted by park name. 
"Year" refers to the year the park was opened. If that date is not available, the year the state acquired the property will be used.   
Left mouse click on the up/down arrows to sort the list by that column. Photo and remarks are unsortable.

See also

 AmeriCorps Florida State Parks
 National Register of Historic Places listings in Florida
 List of National Natural Landmarks in Florida
 List of Florida bike trails
 List of national parks of the United States
 List of U.S. state parks
 List of major springs in Florida

References

External links

Official state park service website
Map of Florida State Parks

Parks
Florida state parks
Parks in Florida